Kahraman Demirtaş (born 1 May 1994) is a Turkish professional footballer who plays as a defender for Konyaspor.

Career
Born in Turkey, Demirtaş played for Verviers, Roda JC Kerkrade, FC Den Bosch, Altınordu, Niğde Anadolu, Göztepe and Konyaspor.

References

1994 births
Living people
People from Mardin
Turkish footballers
R.C.S. Verviétois players
Roda JC Kerkrade players
Göztepe S.K. footballers
FC Den Bosch players
Konyaspor footballers
Niğde Anadolu FK footballers
Belgian Third Division players
Eredivisie players
Süper Lig players
Association football defenders
Turkish expatriate footballers
Turkish expatriate sportspeople in Belgium
Turkish expatriate sportspeople in the Netherlands
Expatriate footballers in Belgium
Expatriate footballers in the Netherlands